The Cemetery of Saint-Louis, Versailles is one of several cemeteries in Versailles, Yvelines. It is among the oldest urban cemeteries in France, having been established in 1770 by the parish of Saint-Louis, Versailles, the church of which is now Versailles Cathedral. Although it may house fewer graves of well-known persons than the Cemetery of Notre-Dame, Versailles, it is nevertheless of significant interest for the artistic quality of many of the tombs and for the quantity of graves of aristocratic families and military officers based at the nearby Palace of Versailles.

A small column against the wall marks the site of the common ditch where some 40 persons were buried, victims of the September Massacres on 9 September 1792. The massacre itself took place at the Quatre Bornes ("Four Milestones"), at the present crossroads between the Rue de Satory and the Rue d'Orléans. The victims had been transferred from the prison at Orléans, and were mostly former senior government officials, officers of the Royal army or refractory priests (among them the Bishop of Mende).

Certain monuments are distinguished by their unusual workmanship, for example that of the naval lieutenant Édouard Villaret-Joyeuse (died in 1854 at Havana), which is in the form of a rostral column.

Notable burials 

 Comte Ferdinand de Bertier de Sauvigny (1782–1864), deputy and prefect of Calvados
 Gustave Borgnis-Desbordes (1839–1900), general, noted for his victories in the colonies
 Alexandre-François Caminade (1783–1862), painter
 Jean-Arnaud de Castellane (1733–1792), Bishop of Mende, in the common ditch
 François Chabas (1817–1882), Egyptologist
 Édouard Charton (1807–1890), Saint-Simonist journalist
 Louis Hercule Timoléon de Cossé-Brissac, duc de Brissac (1734–1792), former governor of Paris, in the common ditch
 Jean-François Ducis (1733–1816), dramaturgist
 Charles Durand, comte de Linois (1761–1848), vice-admiral, governor of Guadeloupe
 Louis-Étienne Dussieux (1815–1894), historian
 Léonce d'Escayrac-Lauture, marquis d'Escayrac (1786–1867), peer of France, deputy
 Stanislas d'Escayrac de Lauture (1822–1868), explorer
 François Franchet d'Esperey (1778–1863), politician, ambassador to Berlin, grandfather of Maréchal Franchet d'Esperey
 Charles-Xavier Franqueville d'Abancourt (1758–1792), briefly Minister of War, nephew of Calonne, in the common ditch
 Abbé Paul de Geslin, known as Jean Loyseau (1817–1888), Pallottine, journalist
 Henri-Constant Groussau (1851–1936), monarchist deputy
 Augusta Holmes (1847–1903), composer
 Jean-Baptiste-Antoine Lassus (1807–1857), architect
 Claudius Lavergne (1815–1887), glass painter, pupil of Ingres. He lies next to his wife, Julie Lavergne (1823–1886), writer
 Henri Le Sidaner (1862–1939), painter, brother-in-law of Georges Rouault
 Jean-Baptiste Mathieu (1764–1847), composer, Master of the King's Chapel
 Anders Osterlind (1887–1960), painter
 Paul Pierret (1836–1916), Egyptologist
 Georges Rouault (1871–1958), painter, brother-in-law of Henri Le Sidaner
 Jean Tharaud (1877–1952), writer
 Claude Antoine de Valdec de Lessart (1741–1792), briefly Minister of Finance and Foreign Affairs of the Constituante, in the common ditch

See also 
 Cimetière des Gonards
 Cemetery of Notre-Dame, Versailles

External links 
 Description of the cemetery 

Versailles
Versailles Saint-Louis
Buildings and structures in Yvelines
1770 establishments in France